Pedro Ramírez was a Spanish painter another of the family of artists who flourished in Seville in the 17th century. He was one of the first members of the Academy established in that city.

References

People from Seville
Spanish Baroque painters
Year of death missing
17th-century Spanish painters
Spanish male painters
Year of birth missing